

The Birdman TL-1 was an extremely minimalist aircraft sold in kit form in the United States in the mid-1970s for US$1,395.

Design and development
The TL-1's fuselage is nothing more than a boom connecting a set of wings with a V-tail. The pilot's seat and a pedestal carrying the pusher engine are attached to the top of the boom just forward of the wing.  Flight control is provided by a series of spoilers.

Construction is of wood covered with Monokote and the aircraft was designed to be quickly dismantled for transport or storage. With an empty weight of 122 lb (55 kg), it is held to be the lightest aircraft to have been flown at the time.

Variants
TL-1A
Base model with longer span wing.
RB-1
Later model with shorter  span wing and simplified landing gear.

Specifications (TL-1)

See also

References

 
 
 Trade a Plane November 1975
 Sports Flying December 1975

1970s United States ultralight aircraft
Homebuilt aircraft
Single-engined pusher aircraft
TL-1
Aircraft first flown in 1975